Brihaspati Kund (Hindi: बृहस्पति कुण्ड) is a natural crater located in Panna District of the Bundelkhand region of Madhya Pradesh, India.

It is popular tourist spot among locals. Distance from Panna is 25 km and distance from Kalinjar Fort is 18 km southwards.

References

External links
 "In Danger: Natural & Cultural Heritage of Brihaspati Kund" at India Wilds

River valleys of India
Tourist attractions in Panna district